Les Poulières is a commune in the Vosges department in Grand Est in northeastern France.

Inhabitants are called Polérois.

Geography
The commune is positioned between Épinal to the west and Saint-Dié to the north-east, in the valley of the Neuné, a tributary of the Vologne River.  Neighbouring communes are Biffontaine and La Chapelle-devant-Bruyères.  Les Poulières is at the confluence of several roads, but roads here are small and twisting, thanks to the topography, on the western fringes of the Vosges Mountains.

See also
Communes of the Vosges department

References

Communes of Vosges (department)